Tales from Terra Firma is the second studio album by British indie rock band Stornoway. It was released in 2013 under the 4AD label.

Track list

References

2013 albums
4AD albums
Stornoway (band) albums